Alejandro Crespo Quiñónez (born February 26, 1915) was a Cuban former outfielder in the Negro leagues who played in the 1940s.

A native of Güira de Melena, Cuba, Crespo made his Negro leagues debut in 1940 with the New York Cubans, and was selected to play in that season's East–West All-Star Game. After spending several seasons in the Mexican League, he returned to New York for the 1946 season. In 1955, he played minor league baseball for the Charlotte Hornets.

References

External links
 and Seamheads

1915 births
Possibly living people
New York Cubans players